is a fictional character from the Fire Emblem series, developed by Intelligent Systems and owned by Nintendo. He is the protagonist and Lord class character in the first and the third games in the series, Fire Emblem: Shadow Dragon and the Blade of Light, and Fire Emblem: Mystery of the Emblem, as well as their respective remakes, Fire Emblem: Shadow Dragon and Fire Emblem: New Mystery of the Emblem.

On December 4, 2020, Marth's original Famicom game and the first installment in the Fire Emblem series was localized and released outside of Japan for the first time to commemorate the franchise's 30th anniversary. Marth's first appearance outside of Japan was in Nintendo's Super Smash Bros. series of fighting games. Marth and Roy's appearances increased western interest in the Fire Emblem series, and in part it led Nintendo to start releasing the games internationally, beginning with Fire Emblem: The Blazing Blade, the seventh installment in the series, released to the west under the title Fire Emblem.

Creation and development
Marth was one of the characters created for Fire Emblem: Shadow Dragon and the Blade of Light by the game's designer and writer Shouzou Kaga. According to Kaga, though Marth takes a prominent role in the story, he is not technically the main protagonist. During early development, a scene would have depicted Marth kneeling in grief next to the body of his retainer Jagen in a pool of Jagen's blood: this was designed to be a symbolic moment of Marth violently coming of age by losing a father figure. Due to hardware limitations, this and other similar scenes needed to be cut. Marth's character designer is currently unknown, though the graphics and character art for Shadow Dragon and the Blade of Light was cooperatively handled by Tohru Ohsawa, Naotaka Ohnishi, Saotshi Machida and Toshitaka Muramatsu. Marth's appearance underwent alterations for promotional posters, having a slightly different hairstyle and an altered shade of blue for his hair.

Marth was redesigned for Fire Emblem: Mystery of the Emblem by the game's character artist Katsuyoshi Koya. For the first game's remake, Fire Emblem: Shadow Dragon, Marth underwent a redesign. The staff's main aim for the redesign was to make the character look and feel fresh while not straying too far from what fans had come to expect. His redesign was handled by Ghost in the Shell artist Masamune Shirow. He was redesigned once again for the third game's remake, New Mystery of the Emblem, by Daisuke Izuka. Marth's design for his appearance in downloadable content for Fire Emblem Awakening was by Senri Kita, the character artist for Fire Emblem: Radiant Dawn. This, along with other character redesigns featured in the game's DLC, was dubbed an "underworld" design.

Super Smash Bros. developer Masahiro Sakurai initially wanted Marth to be part of the roster for the original game, but time constraints prevented this. The developers of Super Smash Bros. Melee originally intended to make Marth playable only in the Japanese version of the game, but when he garnered favorable attention during the game's North American localization, they decided to keep both him and fellow Fire Emblem protagonist Roy in the North American and European versions. Sakurai redesigned the character for Super Smash Bros. Brawl, where he was included as a playable character alongside other Fire Emblem protagonists. By this time, Marth had also been redesigned for Shadow Dragon, with Sakurai being shocked when he saw it. He commented that, if he had known earlier, he would have incorporated the new design into the game rather than his own. Marth's later appearances in the Super Smash Bros. series were brought in line with his design from New Mystery of the Emblem.

The original video animation version of Mystery of the Emblem, Marth was voiced by Hikaru Midorikawa, with Ai Orikasa voicing him as a child. Midorikawa would go on to voice the character in all his subsequent appearances in other media. For the OVA dub, Marth was voiced by Spike Spencer. His name was localized as "Mars", which was put down to the vague pronunciation of the katakana of Marth's name. In his other voiced appearances in video games outside the Super Smash Bros series (with the exception of Super Smash Bros. Ultimate in which he speaks English overseas), Marth has been voiced by Yuri Lowenthal.

Appearances

Video games

Marth debuted in 1990 with the release of Fire Emblem: Shadow Dragon and the Blade of Light in Japan. He is depicted as a heroic prince, sixteen years of age who is forced to flee his home kingdom of Altea after it is attacked. He then leads a rebellion to regain control of his kingdom and save his sister Elice. Marth keeps his role in Mystery of the Emblems Book 1 and Fire Emblem: Shadow Dragon, Ankoku Ryū to Hikari no Kens remakes.

In Fire Emblem: Mystery of the Emblem, released on January 21, 1994, and in the 2010 extended remake of Book 2, Fire Emblem: New Mystery of the Emblem, Marth returns to his role as the story's protagonist. Marth's peaceful reign over Altea is disrupted when he discovers Emperor Hardin, a former ally, comrade and friend, was conquering neighboring kingdoms by force.

In Fire Emblem Awakening, a game set in the far future of his story and starring his distant descendants, Marth is available as both a paid downloadable content character in the "Champions of Yore 1" package (which is also included in a bundle with "Champions of Yore 2," which features Roy from The Binding Blade), and as two different SpotPass characters: "Prince Marth" and "King Marth", representing his portrayals in Shadow Dragon and Shin Monshou no Nazo respectively. During the course of the game's main story, his descendant Princess Lucina of Ylisse disguises herself as Marth and, wearing a mask, actively claims to be him until her father, Chrom, Prince of Ylisse, discovers her true identity.

Marth is set to return in Fire Emblem Engage, as a partner to game's protagonist Alear. Along with other previous protagonists of the series, Marth is summoned as an Emblem to the realm of Elyos using an Emblem Ring and fights alongside Alear to defeat the Fell Dragon.

Marth was introduced to the Western audience by the GameCube title Super Smash Bros. Melee, where he is an unlockable character alongside Roy, who would later appear in the Japanese only release Fire Emblem: The Binding Blade. Marth reappears in the 2008 Wii title Super Smash Bros. Brawl. In the game's story mode, the "Subspace Emissary", he teams up with Ike from Fire Emblem: Path of Radiance and Fire Emblem: Radiant Dawn and Meta Knight from the Kirby series. His final smash, Critical Hit, strikes opponents with a blow that instantly knocks them out of the screen unless they hit a barrier. During this attack, a quickly-depleting 60 HP health bar is shown, as an homage to the Fire Emblem series' battle system. Marth is also playable in Super Smash Bros for Nintendo 3DS and Wii U, using his character design from New Mystery of the Emblem. He is also a starter character in the series for the first time. Marth was confirmed in the June 2018 Nintendo Direct to return in Super Smash Bros. Ultimate for the Nintendo Switch. For the first time in the series, he received an English voice. Yuri Lowenthal voiced him in the game's North American release while Hikaru Midorikawa reprised his role in the Japanese release.

Additionally, by using his respective Amiibo figure, Marth can be unlocked as a playable character in both Code Name: S.T.E.A.M. and Fire Emblem Fates using the New Nintendo 3DS''' Near Field Communication function.

In other media
An anime under the title Fire Emblem was released in 1996, adapting a part of the first game's plot. Marth's name is romanized as 'Mars' and he is given the surname of 'Lowell'. The anime ended production after only two episodes were finished.
Marth is featured as a card in both of the final expansion sets for the Fire Emblem Trading Card Game along with other characters from Fire Emblem: Mystery of the Emblem, and also appears as a promotional card.

Character
In the story set in the kingdom of Altea, the hero Marth gathered an army to recapture and restore his home and the rest of the Archanea continent, and is the warrior who twice slew the Shadow Dragon Medeus. Being in the first Fire Emblem game, Ankoku Ryū to Hikari no Ken he is the first Lord (main character) of the Fire Emblem series. Typical of most Fire Emblem "Lords" in successive games, he is a swordsman with a slim build and wears a cape; he shows nobility and justness in both of the Fire Emblem games that he appears in, though he also shows himself to be somewhat single-minded in his pursuit in Shadow Dragon. He also has difficulty in expressing his romantic feelings for the character Caeda in that game's epilogue (if she survived). His nobility of character has carried over to the anime, in which he is fighting against villains. His father Cornelius was the King of Altea, his elder sister Elice is the Princess of Altea, and Caeda becomes his queen at the end of the game. Marth wields the Divine Blade of Legends, Falchion, as his main weapon in both the Fire Emblem games and Super Smash Bros. series.

One hundred years had passed since Medeus was slain in Archanea. Once Medeus was resurrected he rebuilt his land of Dolhr, readying himself for an invasion of Archanea once again. After the attack from Dolhr, Marth was forced into exile on the island nation of Talys. His father, Cornelius, was killed battling Gharnef, an evil priest and a devout follower of Medeus; his elder sister Elice was taken hostage. He had also discovered that Altea's neighbor and ally Gra has betrayed the kingdom, due to Gharnef's manipulations and King Jiol's cowardice. With the help of the Altean knight Jagen, the Talysian Princess Caeda, and other characters, Marth embarks on a quest to defeat Medeus, reclaim the kingdom of Altea, and rescue his sister. Marth meets Nyna, the princess of Archanea-the most prominent kingdom—who gave him the country's national treasure, the Fire Emblem. Marth later obtains the Falchion sword, which was stolen from his father by Gharnef. He uses it to confront Medeus.

After the defeat of Medeus, Marth was engaged to Caeda and spent his days peacefully in Altea. It wasn't until rumours had it that Hardin—a former ally and friend of Marth—had begun to conquer various countries in Archanea with the help of the Manaketes that Marth was forced to leave his rule of Altea to investigate. When Marth and his men gathered at Grust, several of his former allies were fleeing, or some were murdered during the pillages of Hardin. Marth then travelled to Macedonia where he reunited with Linde, a mage of Archanea, who had been keeping the Fire Emblem safe from harm. He discovers that several magical spheres are needed for the Fire Emblem to regain its true power. Marth retrieves most of the spheres, only to realize that Hardin had conquered Altea in his absence. He leaves to see Gra, a kingdom that had seen a similar fate to what happened to Altea. He meets Sheema, Gra's princess, who had left Gra when her father decided to betray Altea as she wanted no part in it.

After reaching his palace, Marth defeats Hardin, obtaining the Darksphere. The spheres are placed on the Fire Emblem, which becomes the Shield of Seals. Marth discovers that Hardin wasn't really evil and was possessed by the evil priest Gharnef himself through the Darksphere. He then heads to Dolhr where Gharnef lurks. After Gharnef is defeated, all that remains is the new reborn Medeus, guarded by Earth Dragons and possessed clerics, including his sister, Elice, and Princess Nyna. The Shield of Seals emits a power that forces the Earth Dragons to retreat, giving Marth's army the opportunity to save the clerics and for Marth to defeat Medeus once and for all with a slash of Falchion. Afterward, Marth is declared Emperor of Archanea and is finally married to Caeda.

Reception
Marth was noted to be the most famous character in the series by Official Nintendo Magazine, and a popular character by GamesRadar and IGN. In North American Fire Emblem character popularity polls running up to the release of Fire Emblem Heroes, Marth was ranked number 6th out of all Fire Emblem male characters. Marth's inclusion in the Super Smash Bros. series of video games popularized both him and Fire Emblem in the West; it was in part because of his inclusion that Nintendo began releasing the games internationally beginning with The Blazing Blade. Series producer Toru Narihiro attributed an increase in reputation for both Marth and fellow Fire Emblem character Ike to their appearances in Super Smash Bros. Brawl, adding that their reputations grew beyond the staff's expectations. UGO Networks remarked Marth is "cool" because he is a "blade-wielding fighter who is both quick and strong", adding he is "one of the more capable fighters on the roster" of Brawl. In 2013, Complex'' ranked him 36th among the 50 greatest soldiers in video games.

References

External links
 FIRE EMBLEM MUSEUM Fire Emblem: Ankoku Ryū to Hikari no Tsurugi（Marth） at Nintendo Co., Ltd. (NCL)
 FIRE EMBLEM MUSEUM Fire Emblem: Monshō no Nazo website（Ankokusensouhen no Marth） at NCL
 FIRE EMBLEM MUSEUM Fire Emblem: Monshō no Nazo website（Eiyūsensouhen no Marth） at NCL
Marth at Fire Emblem Wiki

Fictional swordfighters in video games
Fictional war veterans
Fire Emblem characters
Prince characters in video games
Male characters in video games
Nintendo protagonists
Role-playing video game characters
Super Smash Bros. fighters
Video game characters introduced in 1990
Video game mascots